Det är långt till New York is a 1988 Swedish drama film directed by Bengt Danneborn. Danneborn and Lennart Persson won the award for Best Screenplay at the 24th Guldbagge Awards.

Cast
 Erik Kiviniemi as Jouni Mäkinen
 Lars Litens as Martin Holmbäck
 Ewa Carlsson as Karin
 Eva Remaeus as Maj
 Margreth Weivers as Sigrid Holmbäck
 Yvonne Schaloske as Anna

References

External links
 
 

1988 films
1988 drama films
Swedish drama films
1980s Swedish-language films
1980s Swedish films